Álvaro Luis Delgado Ceretta (born 11 March 1969) is a Uruguayan veterinarian, rural producer and politician of the National Party (PN) who is the current Secretary of the Presidency of the Republic, since 1 March 2020. He also previously served as National Representative from 2005 to 2015, as well as Senator from 2015 to 2020. 

Born in Montevideo and graduated from the University of the Republic in 1995 with the degree of Doctor of Veterinary and Veterinary Technology, Delgado has a postgraduate degree in Agroindustrial Management in the School of Management and International Studies of the ORT University Uruguay.

Career 
He is a rural producer and was a veterinary advisor in agricultural establishments. He participates especially in the elaboration of agricultural investment projects. Of broad militancy in the National Party, Delgado formed the group «Aire Fresco» with Luis Alberto Lacalle Pou. 

He joined the Cloister of the Faculty of Veterinary Medicine, representing the student order 1987–1989 (University Guild Current - CGU).

Politics 
In the 2004 election he was elected National Representative for Montevideo Department for the period 2005-2010 and was reelected for the period 2010-2015 by the Fresh Air sector - List 404, which he founded with Lacalle Pou. During his term in the Chamber of Representatives he chaired the Energy and Mining Industry Commission (2006, 2011, 2012 and 2013). He also chaired the Special Commission for the Study of Cooperativism. In the 2014 election he was elected Senator of the Republic, and in 2019 he was reelected. He topped the list to the Senate of the «Aire Fresco» sector,  which was the most voted list of the entire National Party. 

As of November 2020, Delgado is seen as a presidential hopeful for 2024.

Personal life 
He is married to Leticia Lateulade and they have three children, Agustina, Felipe, Pilar.

References

External links 
 Official website

National Party (Uruguay) politicians
Members of the Chamber of Representatives of Uruguay
Members of the Senate of Uruguay
Uruguayan veterinarians
1969 births
Living people